Quonset Glacier is a glacier about 20 miles (32 km) long which drains the north slopes of Wisconsin Range between Mount LeSchack and Ruseski Buttress and trends west-northwest to enter the north side of Davisville Glacier. Mapped by United States Geological Survey (USGS) from surveys and U.S. Navy air photos, 1960–64, it was named by the Advisory Committee on Antarctic Names (US-ACAN) after the Naval Air Station Quonset Point, Rhode Island, home base of Antarctic Development Squadron Six (VXE-6).

See also
 List of glaciers in the Antarctic

References

Glaciers of Marie Byrd Land